Alexander Zelenko (born 27 July 1976 in Minsk) is a Belarusian eventing rider. He has been selected to compete at the 2020 Tokyo Olympics aboard Carlo Grande Jr.

References

External links
 

Living people
1976 births
Belarusian male equestrians
Sportspeople from Minsk
Equestrians at the 2020 Summer Olympics
Olympic equestrians of Belarus